The John XXIII Salesian Institute is a private Catholic college-preparatory school located in Montevideo, Uruguay.

History 
It was founded in 1964 by the Salesian order and members of the Marist Brothers and the Sons of the Holy Family, with the aim of providing a Catholic and private education in the last years of high school. 

In the first place, it was intended to name the institution in homage to some outstanding Catholic figure in the History of Uruguay, as the options of Francisco Bauzá or Juan Zorrilla de San Martín were already used by other educational centers, it was decided to name it in honor of Pope John XXIII. Since its foundation, the Institute had been exclusively for men, however, in 1973 it began to admit women. In addition, years later the first year of high school (tenth grade) was incorporated.

Campus 
The John XXIII Institute campus is currently located in multiple buildings in the central barrio Cordón of Montevideo. The main building dates back to the 19th century, and originally housed the all-men school Colegio del Sagrado Corazón de Jesús.

Notable people

Alumni 

 Pedro Bordaberry, former Senator of the Republic and presidential candidate.
 Victoria Rodríguez, television presenter and actress.
 Daniel Sturla, archbishop of Montevideo.

Principals 
 Daniel Sturla, archbishop of Montevideo.

See also 
 Sagrado Corazón, Montevideo

References

External links 
 Official John XXIII Institute Web site

Educational institutions established in 1964
Salesian schools
Schools in Montevideo
Private schools in Uruguay
Catholic schools in Uruguay